Ruche may refer to:
 Ruching, in garment design, ruffling or pleating in fabric for decoration or embellishment
 Ruché, a grape